Octopath Traveler is a role-playing video game developed by Square Enix, in collaboration with Acquire. The game was released for the Nintendo Switch in July 2018, for Windows in June 2019, for Stadia in April 2020, and for Xbox One in March 2021. It received generally favorable reviews, with praise for its presentation, music, and battle system, while its story received more mixed responses. The game had sold over 3 million copies worldwide by September 2022.

A prequel, Octopath Traveler: Champions of the Continent, launched for Android and iOS in 2020 in Japan, followed by a worldwide release in 2022. A sequel, Octopath Traveler II, was released worldwide for Nintendo Switch, PlayStation 4, PlayStation 5, and Windows on February 24, 2023.

Gameplay

Octopath Traveler is a role-playing game that sports a graphical aesthetic known as "HD-2D", defined by the developers as combining retro Super NES-style character sprites and textures with polygonal environments and high-definition effects. Players start the game by choosing a protagonist from one of eight adventurers, each of whom begins their journey in different parts of the world. Each character is paired with a distinct character class ("job"). Once a protagonist character is chosen, they cannot be removed from the active party until their story arc, which consists of four chapters, is concluded. Any other character not chosen as the protagonist may be recruited at their starting locations.

Each player character has a unique "Path Action" command that can be used when interacting with NPCs that are divided into two categories: Noble, the ability's effectiveness dependent by the character's level or amount of in-game currency, and Rogue, which has a risk of its user losing credibility with other NPCs. When the player loses enough reputation in a given town, they can no longer use their Path Actions on any NPCs in that town. For example, the Warrior Olberic and the Hunter H'aanit can challenge characters; the Scholar Cyrus and the Apothecary Alfyn can inquire about certain bits of information that can be used for completion of quests or in the form of hidden items; the Merchant Tressa and the Thief Therion can acquire items directly from NPCs; and the Cleric Ophilia and the Dancer Primrose can guide NPCs and use them as guest summons.

The game features a turn-based battle system, in which the player can attack using different kinds of weapons or elemental attacks, as well as use abilities and items. Each party member receives a Boost Point at the end of every turn, of which they can store up to five at a time. During their turn, a player can use up to three Boost Points to boost a command, allowing their character to attack multiple times, raise their defense, or increase the potency of an ability. A Boost Point is not gained the turn after using them. Enemies have a shield counter that lowers whenever they are attacked with a weapon or element they are weak against. When the counter is depleted, they enter a stunned state where they can receive more damage and lose a turn.

Synopsis 
Set in the land of Orsterra, the Order of the Sacred Flame believed their world was created by thirteen deities. One of them, the fallen god Galdera, was sealed away within the afterworld by the other deities after he refused to relinquish what they created. The player follows the stories of eight heroes as they journey through Orsterra: Ophilia Clement, a priestess of the Sacred Flame who undertakes a religious pilgrimage; Cyrus  Albright, a teacher at the Royal Academy who attempts to recover a stolen tome of dark arts called From the Far Reaches of Hell; Tressa Colzione, a merchant who is inspired to go traveling after acquiring a journal detailing a past adventurer's travels; Olberic Eisenberg, a former knight of the Kingdom of Hornburg seeking renewed purpose after his kingdom was destroyed in an attack by a sellsword named Werner; Primrose Azelhart, a dispossessed noblewoman seeking revenge against the Obsidians, a criminal organization that murdered her father; Alfyn Greengrass, a traveling healer inspired to take up the apothecary trade after a stranger saved him from a terminal disease as a child; Therion, a criminal tasked by a noble family to recover a set of dragonstones belonging to them; and H'aanit, a huntress who is tracking her mentor after he left their village to hunt a beast called Redeye.

After progressing through all the characters' various stories, the heroes' quests become intermingled as Ophilia's enemy Mattias, Cyrus' enemy Lucia, the Obsidians, and Olberic’s enemy Werner are all revealed to have been under the employ of the immortal witch Lyblac. Revealed to be Galdera's daughter, Lyblac orchestrated the acquirement of From the Far Reaches of Hell and the dragonstones, along with the destruction of Hornburg, to unseal the Gate of Finis in order to access the afterworld. Using the Obsidians as her personal army to eliminate threats like Primrose's father, Lyblac also attempted to use Graham Crossford, the man who wrote Tressa's journal and saved Alfyn as a boy, as a vessel for Galdera to gain corporeal form due to his bloodline's ties to the god. Graham escaped from her clutches, but was mutated into H’aanit’s enemy Redeye. This forced Lyblac to seek out Graham's only living son Kit to complete the ritual. After tracking down the Gate's location in Hornburg, Lyblac fully resurrects Galdera and is absorbed into him. The eight heroes fight a vicious battle against Galdera, sealing him back into the afterworld and saving Kit, who receives closure with his father's spirit.

Development and release
Octopath Traveler was announced on January 13, 2017, under the working title of Project Octopath Traveler. The project was started by producers Masashi Takahashi and Tomoya Asano, who previously headed the Nintendo 3DS titles Bravely Default and Bravely Second: End Layer. Acquire was chosen as development partner for the game based on their previous work on the What Did I Do to Deserve This, My Lord? series. During the development process, various graphics options such as the depth, resolution, saturation, as well as other features such as whether water should be pixel or photorealistic are taken into consideration to perfect the "HD-2D" look. The eight main characters, four male and four female, are chosen to provide different party variations. All characters have different classes, and the character design, as well as the field commands, are based on different occupations in Medieval Europe. Each playable character is accompanied by unique themes during specifics sections of their story arcs. For example, Primrose's theme is intended to project a femininity that exudes sadness and melancholy. According to sound producer Yasunori Nishiki, the developers wanted to create a sense of wistfulness as well for her music theme even though her story is driven by revenge against her father's killers. Metallic sounds were incorporated into the theme to evoke a desert setting to reflect the beginning of Primrose's journey in the desert city of Sunshade.

The game's first public demo was released on the Nintendo eShop on September 13, 2017, For the demo, Olberic and Primrose were chosen to be the protagonists due to the relative proximity of their stories' starting points, and the developers wanted people to be able to recruit the other character after beating the story. Consideration was also given towards presenting the appeal of the game's mechanics through these characters.
 The second demo was released on June 14, 2018 and included various tweaks and improvements gathered from surveying players, along with all eight playable characters and save data transfer to the full game. The second demo consisted of the first chapters of each character's story, with certain areas blocked off to the player, and also had a three-hour play time limit. 

Octopath Traveler was released worldwide on July 13, 2018. A special edition that includes the game's soundtrack, a replica of the game's in-game currency, a pop-up book, and a replica map of Orsterra was also released the same day. The game was released for Windows on June 7, 2019. A prequel for Android and iOS, titled Octopath Traveler: Conquerors of the Continent, was originally scheduled to be released in Japan in 2019, but was delayed to 2020. A Stadia version released on April 28, 2020. The game was released for Xbox One on March 25, 2021, and added to the Xbox Game Pass service on the same day. According to Takahashi, no downloadable content or other large post-release content updates are planned for the game.

Reception

Octopath Traveler received "generally favorable" reception, according to review aggregator Metacritic. Polygon Jeremy Parish hailed the game as "the magical RPG the Nintendo Switch needed". GameSpot Peter Brown praised the game for its "innovative battle system", character progression and presentation but found that the main drawbacks were the stories of the eight playable characters, which he described as "lackluster" and "repetitive".

The depiction of female characters in Octopath Traveler was met with a mixed response from critics.  While some commentators singled out Primrose's story arc as a highlight of the game, others felt that it was cliched or mishandled due to its reliance on sexist tropes. Edwin Evans-Thirlwell of Eurogamer found Primrose's gameplay mechanic of seducing people to help her in battle to be problematic due to Primrose's backstory of misogyny and sex trafficking. Jess Joho criticized the writers for exploiting the trauma experienced by its female characters like Primrose and Ophelia to give their thin characterization "some semblance of personality or depth".

Sales
Square Enix issued two apologies after many in Japan were unable to purchase a physical copy due to stock shortages the week, and the following week, of its release. The game sold 188,238 physical copies within its first two months on sale in Japan, and placed at number one on the all-format sales chart. By August 2018, the game had sold over a million copies worldwide. As of March 2019, the combined physical and digital sales of the game have exceeded 1.5 million copies worldwide. The PC version was among the best-selling new releases of the month on Steam. Square Enix wrote in March 2020 that combined retail and digital sales of Octopath Traveler had surpassed two million copies. As of February 2021, the combined physical and digital sales of the game have exceeded 2.5 million copies worldwide.

Awards

Sequel
A prequel for Android and iOS, Octopath Traveler: Champions of the Continent, was released in Japan in 2020 and worldwide in 2022. A sequel, Octopath Traveler II, was released for Nintendo Switch, PlayStation 4, PlayStation 5, and Windows on February 24, 2023.

Legacy 
Three future "HD-2D" styled games have been announced as well: a new tactical role-playing game called Triangle Strategy and remakes of Dragon Quest III and Live A Live. Primrose and Olberic appears in Final Fantasy Record Keeper as part of a September 2018 crossover event.

Notes

References

External links
 

2018 video games
Fantasy video games
Japanese role-playing video games
Nintendo Switch games
Square Enix games
Stadia games
Video games developed in Japan
Video games scored by Yasunori Nishiki
Nintendo games
Unreal Engine games
Windows games
Single-player video games
Xbox Cloud Gaming games
Xbox One games
Acquire (company) games